Backlick Road station is located at 6900 Hechinger Drive in Springfield, Virginia. The station serves the Virginia Railway Express Manassas Line on weekdays, except it is bypassed by two inbound trains and one outbound train each day. 

The station serves a right-of-way first laid down in the 1840s by the Orange and Alexandria Railroad. An earlier station on or near the site, Springfield station, was briefly seized by Confederate troops in 1861, recaptured by Union troops, and raided again the following year. The current structure was built by the VRE in 1992.

The right-of-way passed via successor railroads to its current owner, Norfolk Southern. Additional trackage rights are held by VRE and Amtrak, whose Cardinal and Crescent trains pass through Backlick Road station but do not stop there.

Station layout

References

External links 
Backlick Road VRE Station
 Station from Backlick Road entrance from Google Maps Street View

Transportation in Fairfax County, Virginia
Buildings and structures in Fairfax County, Virginia
Virginia Railway Express stations
Railway stations in the United States opened in 1992
1992 establishments in Virginia